U3 small nucleolar RNA-associated protein 15 homolog is a protein that in humans is encoded by the UTP15 gene.

See also

 Fibrillarin
 Small nucleolar RNA U3
 RCL1
 RRP9
 UTP6
 UTP11L
 UTP14A

References

Further reading